Mir Muhammad Ali Rind (Urdu: میر محمد علی رند) is a Pakistani Politician and Member of Senate of Pakistan, currently serving as Chairperson- Senate Committee on Railway.

Political career
He belongs to Baluchistan province of Pakistan, and was elected to the Senate of Pakistan in March 2009 on general seat as Balochistan National Party Awami (BNP-A) candidate, he was later disqualified by the High Court of Balochistan on charges of concealing information that he was previously convicted in corrupt practices and misappropriation of public property. However he was reelected to the senate in the by-poll election for the same seat after Supreme Court of Pakistan allowed him to contest the polls. He is the chairperson of Senate Committee on Railway and member of senate committees of Religious Affairs and Interfaith Harmony, Overseas Pakistanis and Human Resource Development, Functional Committee on Problems of Less Developed Areas, Employees Welfare Fund. Kashmir Affairs & Gilgit Baltistan. He is Vice President of Balochistan National Party (Awami), and previously had been a member of Baluchistan Assembly as MPA in 1985, 1990 and 1997. He was Minister of Revenue and Excise & Taxation in 1990 and Minister for Food, Fisheries and Coastal Development in 1997 in Baluchistan Cabinet.

See also
 List of Senators of Pakistan
 List of committees of the Senate of Pakistan

References

External links
Senate of Pakistan Official Website

Living people
Members of the Senate of Pakistan
1944 births